Anney Anney is a 1983 Indian Tamil-language film directed by Mouli for Kalaivani. The film stars Mouli, Viji and Sumithra. The film was hit at the box office.

Cast 

Mouli as Krishnagiri
Sumithra as Durga Krishnagiri
Viji as Rathna
 Vanitha Krishnachandran as Parvathy (Paaru)
Charle as Faffu
V. K. Ramasamy as 'Mountbatten' Mahadevan
Leo Prabu as Shyam
Ramakrishna as Malli

Soundtrack
Soundtrack was composed by Ilaiyaraaja, with lyrics written by Vaali.
"Andha Naal" - Malaysia Vasudevan
"Uruginen" - S. P. Balasubrahmanyam, S. Janaki
"Vaikira Idathil" - Malaysia Vasudevan
"Vettu Vedipom" - Malaysia Vasudevan

References

External links 
 

1983 films
Indian comedy films
Films scored by Ilaiyaraaja
1980s Tamil-language films
1983 comedy films
Films directed by T. S. B. K. Moulee